Anton Pushkov (born November 22, 1988) is a Russian professional basketball.

Professional career
Pushov began his professional career with Volzhanin-GES Volzhskiy in 2008 and stayed with the team until mid 2010–11 season. Then, he moved to the second team of Khimki Moscow and later joined the main team. With Khimki, he won the 2011–12 Eurocup Basketball championship. He moved to the Krasnye Krylya during the 2012–13 season and won the 2012–13 FIBA EuroChallenge with them.

Pushov signed a contract with Zenit Saint Petersburg in the summer of 2015. In July 2019, he signed a new two-year contract with Zenit. Pushkov signed a two-year extension with the team on July 21, 2021.

References

External links
 Anton Pushkov at eurobasket.com
 Anton Pushkov at euroleague.net

Russian men's basketball players
1988 births
BC Zenit Saint Petersburg players
Living people
Centers (basketball)
Sportspeople from Surgut